Ahmet Fetgeri Aşeni (1886–1966) was a Turkish navy officer, sports official and politician during the Atatürk era. He was also one of the founding members of Beşiktaş JK, which he also served as a president.

References 

1886 births
1966 deaths
People from Sakarya Province
Republican People's Party (Turkey) politicians
20th-century Turkish politicians
Beşiktaş J.K. presidents